Fulton Yard is a rail yard on CSX Transportation's Peninsula Subdivision in Richmond, Virginia.  It has 13 tracks.

See also
 List of rail yards

CSX Transportation
Rail infrastructure in Virginia
Rail yards in the United States
Transportation in Richmond, Virginia